The  is a subway line, part of the Fukuoka City Subway system in Fukuoka, Japan. It runs from Hashimoto Station in Nishi Ward to Tenjin-Minami Station in Chūō Ward, all within Fukuoka. The line's color on maps is green. Officially, the line is called . Like other Fukuoka City Subway lines, stations are equipped with automatic platform gates, and trains are automatically operated by ATO system.

Overview 
All stations are equipped with platform screen doors. 

Station numbering for all stations on the Fukuoka City Subway was introduced in March 2011.

During peak hours, the frequency is one train every 3 minutes 45 seconds. Starting on 11 March 2023, the interval will be increased to every 3 minutes 30 seconds.

Stations

History 
This is the fourth linear motor subway line to be built in Japan, opening on 3 February 2005.
The Nanakuma Line was originally conceived in the 1960s to provide access to Nakamura Gakuen University and Fukuoka University, and in 1975 it was planned to run from Tenjin-Minami Station to Jōnan Station as a linear-motored subway, but the plan was subsequently amended for the line to end at Hashimoto Station.

The name for the line was selected in a naming contest. "Nanakuma Line", which finished third, was selected over the first-place "Jonan Line" and runner-up "Fukudai Line" because of its stronger historical connotations as well as being more geographically accurate compared to the other names. Nanakuma is a district in Jōnan ward which is close to the center of the line.

The line links the Central business district and the southwestern part of the city which previously did not have a railway line.

Future Plans

Hakata Station extension 
Construction on a  extension from Tenjin-Minami to Hakata station via Canal City received its final planning permissions in 2014. Construction was initially scheduled to be completed by 2020, but delays after a sinkhole opening up in front of JR Hakata Station pushed the schedule up by three years. On 7 January 2021, Fukuoka City announced the planned opening of the extension by March 2023. The city also reported that there were no delays as a result of the COVID-19 Pandemic. The two-station extension is earmarked to begin operation on 27 March 2023.

Fukuoka Airport extension 
On 21 November 2022, Fukuoka mayor Sōichirō Takashima announced plans to extend the Nanakuma line to Fukuoka Airport. Currently, the domestic terminal at Fukuoka Airport is served by the Kūkō Line on the subway network. However, the international terminal lacks a rail connection. A free shuttle bus currently connects the two terminals.

Rolling Stock 

The line currently employs four-car long 3000 series trains purchased in 2005 for the start of revenue service. There are 17 sets accounting for 68 cars.

A further four sets were ordered in 2021.

See also
List of railway lines in Japan

References

External links
 Fukuoka City Subway official website 
 Fukuoka City Subway official website 
 Hitachi: Linear-Motor Subways : The Future of Urban Mass Transit

 
Fukuoka City Subway
Railway lines opened in 2005
Linear motor metros
Standard gauge railways in Japan
2005 establishments in Japan